Intelligent system may refer to:
 Intelligent Systems, a game developer
 a system with artificial intelligence